André Freire (born 1961, Lisbon, Portugal) is a Portuguese Full Professor of Political Science at ISCTE-IUL, Lisbon University Institute, and a senior researcher at CIES-IUL.

Career and civic activities 
André Freire is a Full Professor of Political Science at ISCTE-IUL, Lisbon University Institute., and a senior researcher at CIES-IUL, where he is also the Director of the Observatory for Democracy and Political Representation. He has been conducting research in the fields of Political Behaviour and Political Attitudes (both on voters and political representatives), Political Representation, Political Elites and Political Institutions, both at the national and international levels. He has lectured about these topics and also has several publications in different languages in books, book chapters and articles in academic periodicals. Freire has received several awards and scholarships related to his research

Moreover, Freire has also been collaborating with several publications in the Portuguese press, on a regular basis with the Público (2006 to 2016) and the Jornal de Letras (2017 to 2021) newspapers, having also been a political commentator on televisions (RTP, TVI and SIC), radios (Antena 1, TSF, etc.) and other newspapers (DN, Expresso, Jornal I, Económico, Jornal de Negócios, etc.).

Civically, he is a member of the National Union of Higher Education (SNESup) and has supported several manifestos and petitions, namely defending the collaboration among the Portuguese left-wing parties to govern, since the 2009 Portuguese legislative elections.

He participated in the blog Ladrões de Bicicletas (in English: «Bicycle Thieves»), from 2007 to 2010, and is a co-creator of the blog A Vaca Voadora (in English: «The Flying Cow»), where he continues to participate since 2016.

Selected publications

Books (author) 
Freire, André (2006), Esquerda e Direita na Política Europeia. Portugal, Espanha e Grécia em Perspectiva Comparada, Lisboa, Imprensa de Ciências Sociais; English translation: Left and Right in European Politics. Portugal, Spain and Greece in Comparative Perspective (2006)

March, Luke, and Freire, André (2012), A Esquerda Radical em Portugal e na Europa: Marxismo, Mainstream ou Marginalidade?, Porto, Quid Novi; English translation: The Radical Left in Portugal and Europe: Marxism, Mainstream or Marginality? (2012)

Freire, André (2017), Para lá da «Geringonça»: O Governo de Esquerdas em Portugal e na Europa, Lisboa, Contraponto; English translation: Beyond the «Contraption»: The Leftist Government in Portugal and Europe (2017)

Freire, André (2022), Left and Right. Meaning and Correlates in Long Consolidated and New Democracies, Moldova: Eliva Press.

Books (editor) 
Freire, André, Marina Costa Lobo & Pedro Magalhães (editors) (2007), Portugal at the Polls. The 2002 Legislative Elections, Lanham, MD: Lexington.

Freire, André (editor) (2011), Eleições e Sistemas Eleitorais no século XX Português: Um Balanço Histórico e Comparativo, Lisboa, Colibri; English translation: Elections and Electoral Systems on the Portuguese XX century: An Historical and Comparative balance (2011)

Freire, André (editor) (2012), O Sistema Político Português, séculos XIX-XXI: Continuidades e Ruturas, Coimbra, Almedina; English translation: The Portuguese Political System, centuries XIX-XXI: Continuities and Ruptures (2012)

Freire, André, Mélany Barragan, Xavier Coler, Marco Lisi & Emmanouil Tsatsanis (editors) (2020), Political representation in Southern Europe and Latin America: Before and After the Great Recession and the Commodity Crisis, Edited volume for Routledge book series “Routledge Research on Social and Political Elites”.

Lisi, Marco, André Freire & Emmanouil Tsatsanis (editors) (2020), Political Representation and Citizenship in Portugal: from Crisis to Renewal?, Lexington Books – Rowman & Littlefield.

Articles (or edition of special issues) in international peer reviewed journals 
Freire, André (2006), “Bringing Social Identities Back In: The Social Anchors of Left-Right Orientation in Western Europe”, International Political Science Review, 27 (4), 359–378. DOI: https://doi.org/10.1177/0192512106067358

Costa, Olivier, André Freire Jean-Benoit Pilet (2012), Editors of the Symposium “Political representation in Belgium, France, and Portugal: MPs and their constituents in very different political systems”, organized for the journal Representation – Journal of Representative Democracy, Volume 48 (4), pp. 351–418. (4 articles plus introduction).

Freire, André  & Ana Belchior (2013), “Ideological Representation in Portugal: MPs-Electors Linkages in Terms of Left-Right Placement and Substantive Meaning”, Journal of Legislative Studies, 19, No.1 (March 2013), pp. 1–21. DOI: https://doi.org/10.1080/13572334.2013.736784

Freire, André, Marco Lisi, Ioannis Andreadis & José Manuel Leite Viegas (2014), Editors of the Special Issue “Political Representation in times of Bailout: Evidence from Portugal and Greece”, South European Society and Politics, Vol. 19, nº 4, pp. 413–559 (6 articles plus introduction).

Freire, André (2015), “Left-Right Ideology as a Dimension of Identification and as a Dimension of Competition”, Journal of Political Ideologies, Volume 20, Nº1, pp. 43–68. DOI: https://doi.org/10.1080/13569317.2015.991493

Freire, André & Marco Lisi (2016), Editors of the Dossiê “Political Parties, Citizens and the Economic Crisis: the Evolution of Southern European Democracies”, Portuguese Journal of Social Science, Vol. 15, Nº 2, pp. 153–274 (articles on Cyprus, by Yiannos Katsourides – University of Cyprus; Greece, by Emmanouil Tsatsanis – CIES-IUL; Spain, by Lucia Medina – UAB; Italy, by Marco Lisi - FCSH-UNL; & Portugal, by André Freire - ISCTE-IUL; – plus introduction by André Freire & Marco Lisi).

Freire, André, and Kats Kivistik (2016), «Regime transition, value conflicts and the left-right divide at the mass level: The Baltic States and Southern Europe compared», Communist and Post-Communist Studies, Vol. 49, Nº 4, pp. 293–311 (within the 2016 special issue on «The transformations of far right and far left in Europe». Guest Editor, Marlene Laruelle). DOI: https://doi.org/10.1016/j.postcomstud.2016.08.002

Freire, André, & Kivistik, Kats (2018), «Authoritarian legacies and mass left-right regime support in new democracies: The Baltic States and Southern Europe compared», Comparative European Politics, Volume 16 (2), pp 249–270. DOI: 10.1057/cep.2015.25

Freire, André (2021), "Left-wing governmental alliance in Portugal, 2015-2019: A way of renewing and rejuvenating social democracy?", Brazilian Political Science Review, 15(2), DOI: 10.1590/1981-3821202100020004

Freire, André,  Andrea Pedrazzani, Emmanouil Tsatsanis, Xavier Coller & Paolo Segatti (2021), "Age and Descriptive Representation in Southern Europe: The Impact of the Great Recession on National Parliaments, South European Society and Politics", 26:2, 271-301, DOI: 10.1080/13608746.2022.2026336

References

External links 
 André Freire's Curriculum Vitae at Ciência-IUL;
 ResearchGate;
 Academia Edu;
 ORCID;
 André Freire's Google Scholar ID;

Portuguese political scientists
Living people
1961 births